Pyayve is the rural locality (a Station) in Kolsky District of Murmansk Oblast, Russia. The village is located beyond the Arctic circle, on the Kola Peninsula.

References

Rural localities in Murmansk Oblast